Anthropornis is a genus of giant penguin that lived 45-33 million years ago, during the Late Eocene and the earliest part of the Oligocene.

Description 
Fossils of it have been found in the La Meseta Formation on Seymour Island off the coast of Antarctica and in New Zealand.

The type species, Anthropornis nordenskjoldi, had a bent joint in the wing, probably a vestigial trait from its flying ancestors.

References 

Prehistoric bird genera
Eocene birds
Oligocene birds
Extinct penguins
Priabonian genus first appearances
Rupelian genus extinctions
Prehistoric birds of Antarctica
Paleogene Antarctica
Fossils of Antarctica
Fossil taxa described in 1905
Fossils of New Zealand